Henk Blomvliet (24 February 1911 – 14 March 1980) was a Dutch footballer. He played in two matches for the Netherlands national football team in 1939.

References

External links
 

1911 births
1980 deaths
Dutch footballers
Netherlands international footballers
Footballers from Amsterdam
Association football defenders
AFC Ajax players